The 13th Floor is a 1988 horror film directed by Chris Roache and starring Miranda Otto and Lisa Hensley.

References

External links

The 13th Floor at Oz Movies

Australian horror films
1988 horror films
1988 films
1980s English-language films
1980s Australian films